The word Clackamas may refer to:

 Clackamas people, a Native American people in what is now Oregon
 The now extinct language spoken by the tribe, one of the Chinookan languages

Named after tribe 
 The Clackamas River, a tributary of the Willamette River in northwestern Oregon
 Clackamas County, Oregon
 Clackamas, Oregon, a community in Clackamas County
 Clackamas High School in Clackamas, Oregon
 Clackamas Community College in Oregon City, Clackamas County
 The North Clackamas School District in Clackamas County
 Clackamas iris or Iris tenuis
 "Clackamas", a codename for Intel's 64-bit processor technology

Language and nationality disambiguation pages